Pape Moustapha Diop (born 1 January 1996) is a Senegalese basketball player. He plays for the Senegal national basketball team and Joeuf-Homécourt Basket in France.

College career 
A Dakar native, Diop played college basketball in Canada for Cape Breton University of Sydney. He averaged 2.5 points in 12.5 minutes per game in the 2017–18 season. On January 13, 2018, Diop scored a career-high 11 points in a 114–93 loss against UNB.

Professional career
Diop played for the Estonian Side BC Tallinna Kalev  in the 2018–19 season, he averaged 1.25 points, 0.75 rebound and  0.25 assists per game.

In 2019, Diop returned to Senegal to play for AS Douanes. On November 4, 2019, he was named the MVP of the Senegalese Basketball Cup after a 28 points and 13 rebounds performance in the final. In the same season, he also won the Nationale 1 title and was named the league's Finals MVP.

In 2021, he transferred to DUC Dakar.

In the 2021–22 season, Diop plays for Joeuf-Homécourt Basket in the National Masculine 2, the French fourth tier level. He scored 37 points in his debut against Étoile Charleville-Mézières.

National team career
Diop represented the Senegal national basketball team at the 2019 FIBA Basketball World Cup qualification where he averaged 2 points, 2.3 rebound and  0.5 assists per game.
He also played at the 2019 FIBA Basketball World Cup in China, where he averaged 3 points, 1 rebound and  0.2 assists per game. Diop also played at FIBA AfroBasket 2021, helping the team win a bronze medal.

References

1996 births
Living people
DUC Dakar players
Senegalese men's basketball players
2019 FIBA Basketball World Cup players
BC Tallinn Kalev players
AS Douanes basketball players
Senegalese expatriate basketball people in Estonia
Sportspeople from Dakar